Valerie Wellington (November 14, 1959 – January 2, 1993) was an American singer who, in her short career, switched from singing opera to singing Chicago blues and electric blues. On her 1984 album, Million Dollar Secret, she worked with Sunnyland Slim, Billy Branch, and Magic Slim. She also worked with Lee "Shot" Williams.

Biography
She was born Valerie Eileen Hall in Chicago, Illinois. She was trained as an opera singer and graduated from the American Conservatory of Music, but in 1982 she took up singing the blues in Chicago clubs. She also worked in theater, playing roles portraying earlier blues singers, such as Ma Rainey and Bessie Smith. Her opera training enabled her to project her voice to theater audiences. She appeared at the 1984 San Francisco Blues Festival, on a bill with Marcia Ball and Katie Webster.

Her recorded work blended a traditional vaudeville approach with a contemporary Chicago blues format. Wellington made few recordings, but her voice was used in advertisements on television and radio. Her recording of "Whole Lotta Shakin' Goin' On" was used on the soundtrack of the 1989 film Great Balls of Fire!, in which she briefly appeared, depicting Big Maybelle. In the same year, she toured Japan with Carlos Johnson.

Wellington died of a cerebral aneurysm in Maywood, Illinois, in January 1993, at the age of 33. She was interred at the Restvale Cemetery, in Alsip, Illinois.

Million Dollar Secret was reissued by Rooster Blues in 1995.

Discography

See also
List of Chicago blues musicians
List of electric blues musicians

References

External links
Allaboutjazz.com
African American Registry at Aaregistry.org

1959 births
1993 deaths
American blues singers
20th-century African-American women singers
Chicago blues musicians
Electric blues musicians
Deaths from intracranial aneurysm
Singers from Chicago
American film actresses
African-American actresses
American musical theatre actresses
20th-century American actresses
20th-century American singers
American Conservatory of Music alumni
20th-century American women singers
Flying Fish Records artists
Burials at Restvale Cemetery